The 1909 Harvard Crimson football team represented Harvard University. The Crimson were led by second year head coach Percy Haughton and played their home games at Harvard Stadium. They finished the season with a 9–1 record.

Schedule

References

Harvard
Harvard Crimson football seasons
Harvard Crimson football
1900s in Boston